Annan is a town and former royal burgh in Dumfries and Galloway, south-west Scotland. Historically part of Dumfriesshire, its public buildings include Annan Academy, of which the writer Thomas Carlyle was a pupil, and a Georgian building now known as "Bridge House". Annan also features a Historic Resources Centre. In Port Street, some of the windows remain blocked up to avoid paying the window tax.

Each year on the first Saturday in July, Annan celebrates the Royal Charter and the boundaries of the Royal Burgh are confirmed when a mounted cavalcade undertakes the Riding of the Marches. Entertainment includes a procession, sports, field displays and massed pipe bands. Annan's in America first migrated to New York and Virginia.  Annandale Virginia is an early settlement which celebrates The Scottish Games annually.

Geography

History
Roman remains exist nearby.

The Mote of Annan formed the original home of the de Brus family, later known as the Bruces, lords of Annandale, which most famously produced Robert the Bruce.  It was at the Battle of Annan in December 1332 that Bruce supporters overwhelmed Balliol's forces to bring about the end of the first invasion of Scotland in the Second War of Scottish Independence. The Balliols and the Douglases were also more or less closely associated with Annan. Annan Castle once stood in the old churchyard and was originally the church tower.

The Battle of Bruce's Acres was fought near Newbie Castle against the English in the 13th century.

Bruce's Well is a natural spring that lies on the edge of the River Annan just downstream of the Gala Burn and Glen. It is associated with Robert the Bruce as recorded by Historic Environment Scotland.

During the period of the Border lawlessness the inhabitants suffered repeatedly at the hands of moss-troopers and through the feuds of rival families, in addition to the losses caused by the Scottish Wars of Independence. During his retreat from Derby, Bonnie Prince Charlie stayed in the High Street at the inn where Back to the Buck now stands.

With the river embanked, Annan served as a maritime town whose shipyards built many clippers and other boats. A cairn on the jetty commemorates Robert Burns, who worked as an exciseman here in the 1790s. Although the port is now mainly dry, a few stranded boats remain.

The alumni of Annan Academy include Thomas Carlyle.

After the Acts of Union 1707, Annan, Dumfries, Kirkcudbright, Lochmaben and Sanquhar formed the Dumfries district of burghs, returning one member between them to the House of Commons of Great Britain. Annan previously formed a constituency of the Parliament of Scotland and the Convention of Estates. In 1871, the Dumfries Burghs had a population of 3,172 and the royal burgh of Annan had 4,174, governed by a provost and 14 councillors.

A Harbour Trust was established in 1897 to improve the port. The small Newbie Harbour lay on the other side of the River Annan near Newbie Mill and served the old Newbie Castle and barony.

Annan Town Hall was built in Scottish baronial style using the local sandstone and completed in 1878.

By 1901, the population was 5,805, living principally in red sandstone buildings.

The railway turntable was designed and developed in Annan; it can be seen today at the National Railway Museum, York.

In 2021, the town was affected by heavy rainfall and flooding, resulting in the collapse of two footbridges on the River Annan. 
The Cuthbertson Memorial Bridge, down from Galabank and in view of the A75 bypass, was completed in 1957 in memory of Surgeon Lieutenant William Cuthbertson who died in the Second World War.
Meanwhile, the Diamond Jubilee Bridge, accessible from the Warmanbie road, was much older having been built in 1897 to commemorate Queen Victoria's 60th year on the throne.
The local population was devastated by the bridges being swept away as they were symbolic, vital and important for the local community. The nearest crossing of the river is south at Annan Bridge and at the north it is Brydekirk.

Town colours

Annan, along with many other local settlements in the Dumfriesshire region, use the colours black and gold on the town's sports teams. A proposed flag was designed by Philip Tibbetts in 2017, but has yet to be adopted. However, the coat of arms of the town show the Bruce red saltire on gold background combination. Meanwhile, the Riding of the Marches common riding is synonymous with the royal blue and gold pairing.

Landmarks
Just outside the town, the Chapelcross nuclear power station has now shut down and is being decommissioned. The four cooling towers were demolished in 2007.

Nearby, John Maxwell, 4th Lord Herries, built Hoddom Castle (–1565).

To the east of the town lies the settlement of Watchill and the similarly named Watchhall.

Part of the A75 between Annan and Dumfries is reported to be haunted.

Distillery
Annandale distillery has now officially re-opened in Annan, which last produced a Lowland Malt 90 years ago, although it is still in early stages.

Churches
Annan is served by several churches of different denominations, including:
Annan Old Parish Church, High Street (Church of Scotland)
St. Andrew's Parish Church, Bank Street (Church of Scotland)
Annan URC, Station Road (United Reformed Church)
St. John's Church, St. John's Road (Scottish Episcopal Church)
St. Columba's Church, 40 Scotts Street (Catholic Church)  Built as a Congregational Church in 1794 became a Catholic church in 1839. Added to in 1904 by Charles Walker of Newcastle as the gift of the parish priest the Rev Canon Lord Archibald Douglas.

There is also a local interchurch group, known as Annandale Churches Together.

Economy
In the 19th century, Annan was connected to the Glasgow & South Western Railway, the Caledonian Railway, and the Solway Junction Railway. It exported cured hams, cattle, sheep, and grain to England; it also produced cotton goods, ropes, ships, and salmon. By the First World War, it was also a center of bacon-curing, distilling, tanning, sandstone quarrying, and nursery-gardening.

Cochran Boilers 1878, Cochran and Co, Annan, Engineers. James Taylor Cochran and Edward Compton started their company Cochran Boilers in Birkenhead, moving to Annan in 1897/ 98. Where it grew to be a major world wide exporter of Cochran Boilers. There in 1998 it celebrated its one hundred years in Scotland. It was Cochran who invented the famous Cochran Vertical Boiler. The boiler was an immediate success. ( the company also produced paddle steamers and two early submarines with novel steam plants ).

Education
 Annan Academy is the town's secondary school that covers the whole of South Annandale.
 Dumfries & Galloway College located in Dumfries is a popular place for further education for students from Annan.

Transportation
Annan Bridge, a stone bridge of three arches, built between 1824 and 1827, carries road traffic over the River Annan.  It was designed by Robert Stevenson and built by John Lowry. There is also a railway bridge and a nearby pedestrian bridge over the Annan. It is still served by the Annan railway station, the old Solway Junction Railway station Annan Shawhill having closed to passengers in 1931 and freight in 1955. Newbie Junction Halt railway station briefly served the old Newbie Tile and Brickworks as well as the Cochran's Boiler Works that stood on the short Newbie Branch.

Outdoor activity
Annandale Way is a  walking route that was opened in September 2009. The route runs through Annandale, from the source of the River Annan to the sea; it passes through the town of Annan and offers interesting walking both up river and down from the town.

Sport
The town is very active in sport in the local community.

 Annan Athletic F.C. are the local men's semi-professional football team that play at Galabank Stadium in the SPFL League Two. The club also have a women's team and various youth teams.
 Solway Star F.C. were a Scottish Football League team that played at Summergate before moving to Kimmeter Park Green and then Mafeking Park. 
 Annan F.C. played in three seasons of the Scottish Cup from 1878 to 1890.
 Annan Town A.F.C. and F.C. Annan both play in the Dumfries Sunday Amateur Football League
 Annan R.F.C. - Rugby Union
 Annan Alligators - Swimming
 ADAC - Athletics
 Annan Pétanque Club (Est. 2021)

Notable people
Andy Aitken – professional footballer best known for his long service with Queen of the South F.C.
Cameron Bell – ex-footballer who played for Kilmarnock F.C., Rangers F.C. and Scotland national football team among others.
 Thomas Blacklock - (1721–1791), Scottish poet.
Thomas Carlyle
David Gow - engineer
Edward Irving - there is a statue of him in the grounds of Annan Old Parish Church. The statue was relocated from outside the town hall in the 1960s.
Ashley Jensen – actress, best known for her roles in Extras and Ugly Betty.
George Johnston – Leader of the New South Wales rum rebellion, briefly Lieutenant-Governor there
David Leslie (racing driver)
William Ewart Lockhart (1846–1900) – artist
Robert Murray M'Cheyne – preacher, ordained by the Annan Presbytery.
David Payne (1843–1894) – landscape artist.
Jim Wallace, MSP for Orkney between 1999 - 2007 and the Deputy First Minister of Scotland between 1999 - 2005, born in Annan.
Hardy Wright – greyhound trainer who lived initially at Watchhall, responsible for bringing the Barbican Cup (coursing) to Scotland for the first time.
Jack Wright – coursing enthusiast, who lived at Watchhall, father of Hardy Wright.

Gallery

See also

List of places in Dumfries and Galloway
 Annan (surname)

Notes

References
 

Attribution:

External links

 
 Annan Online
 Local Authority website
 National Library of Scotland: Scottish Screen Archive (archive film compilation of local events in Annan, 1925 – 1937)

 
Annandale and Eskdale
Ports and harbours of Scotland
Royal burghs
Dumfriesshire
Towns in Dumfries and Galloway
Parishes in Dumfries and Galloway